The Women's Tennis Association (WTA) Tour is the elite professional tennis circuit organized by the WTA. The 2010 WTA Tour calendar comprises the Grand Slam tournaments (supervised by the International Tennis Federation (ITF)), the WTA Premier tournaments (Premier Mandatory, Premier 5 and regular Premier), the WTA International tournaments, the Fed Cup (organized by the ITF), and the year-end championships (the Commonwealth Bank Tournament of Champions and the WTA Tour Championships). Also included in the 2010 calendar is the Hopman Cup, which does not distribute ranking points and is organized by the ITF.

Notable stories

Serena Williams' season 

Serena Williams began the season ranked World No. 1, having enjoyed an impressive 2009 season in which she won the Australian Open and Wimbledon (she would successfully defend both titles this year) and reclaimed the World No. 1 ranking on two occasions. Williams began her season by successfully defending her Australian Open title, defeating Justine Henin in a three-set final. She also successfully defended her Wimbledon title, defeating surprise finalist Vera Zvonareva in the final, 6–3, 6–2.

However, shortly after winning Wimbledon, Serena Williams would injure her foot at a German restaurant where she was celebrating her victory, but it didn't deter her from playing in an exhibition match against Kim Clijsters in front of a world-record tennis crowd that same week. The foot injury ended up being very serious enough to necessitate surgery, and as a result she missed the rest of the season and would not return to top-level tennis until June 2011. She was forced to miss her first US Open since 2003, and also had to withdraw from the year-end championships having qualified by virtue of winning Wimbledon. The injury worsened late in the year; despite accepting a wildcard into Linz, she had to withdraw from that tournament, with her wildcard entry later allocated to former World No. 1 Ana Ivanovic. Despite progress in her recovery from foot surgery, she lost the World No. 1 ranking to Danish youngster Caroline Wozniacki. Williams then announced her withdrawal from the 2011 Australian Open in November.

Justine Henin's comeback 
Former World No. 1 Justine Henin announced her comeback to the WTA Tour in September last year, in the aftermath of Kim Clijsters' victory at the 2009 US Open. She had previously not played at the highest level since suffering a third round defeat to Dinara Safina (who went on to make the final of the French Open that year) at the 2008 Qatar Telecom German Open. Henin's comeback began impressively, reaching the final of the 2010 Brisbane International in which she lost to her compatriot and rival Kim Clijsters in a final set tiebreak. She had defeated Nadia Petrova and Ana Ivanovic en route. She then reached the final of the Australian Open, in which she was defeated by Serena Williams in three sets, having defeated fifth seed Elena Dementieva in the second round, 27th seed Alisa Kleybanova in the third, qualifier Yanina Wickmayer in the fourth, 19th seed Nadia Petrova in the quarter-finals and Zheng Jie in the semi-finals en route.

She then participated at her first French Open since 2007, where she was defeated in the fourth round by eventual finalist Samantha Stosur, ending a 24-match winning streak at the tournament dating back to 2005. Prior to the defeat against Stosur, Henin had played her first three-set match at the tournament, also since 2005, when she defeated Maria Sharapova in the third round. Later, at Wimbledon, Henin again reached the fourth round, but suffered a three-set loss to rival Clijsters. During the match, she suffered an elbow injury which would later rule her out of the US Open, that same injury would lead to her second (and final) retirement in January 2011.

Ana Ivanovic's season 
The first half of Ana Ivanovic's 2010 season appeared to follow on from her poor 2009 season, as her confidence and game continued to disintegrate since she won the 2008 French Open. She started the season ranked World No. 22 and spent almost the entire season ranked outside the Top 20. She was able to reach the semi-finals at the Brisbane International and the Rome Masters, but those would be her best results in the first half of the season, as she dropped out of the WTA's Top 50 for the first time since 2005 with a second round loss to Anastasija Sevastova at Indian Wells. On court results did not improve throughout the year, and Ivanovic dropped to a low of World No. 65 by July. Adding to a growing season of disappointment, Ivanovic also suffered the ignominy of winning the wooden spoon at Wimbledon, having finished at the end of the tournament's longest losing chain after losing in the first round.

However, Ivanovic would begin to turn her season around at the 2010 Western & Southern Financial Group Women's Open, entering the tournament having lost 17 of her last 29 matches dating back to August 2009 and having dropped to World No. 62. A first round upset win over recent Stanford champion Victoria Azarenka sparked a run to the semi-finals, where she was forced to retire against Kim Clijsters due to a foot injury; nevertheless, she re-entered the World's Top 40 following her run at Cincinnati. With no rankings points to defend for the remainder of the year, Ivanovic reached the fourth round of the US Open, the first time she had gotten that far at a Grand Slam tournament since Wimbledon in 2009. She defeated Ekaterina Makarova, Zheng Jie and Virginie Razzano before being crushed by defending and eventual champion Kim Clijsters in the fourth round.

Ivanovic continued to maintain her recent good form after the US Open; she was able to reach the quarter-finals in Beijing where she was defeated by Caroline Wozniacki, who eventually replaced Serena Williams as the new World No. 1 by winning the tournament. She then accepted a late wildcard entry into Linz after Williams withdrew due to her ongoing foot surgery, where she won her first title in two years after defeating Patty Schnyder, 6–2, 6–1, in the year's shortest final; the title returned Ivanovic to the world's Top 30, and qualified her for the 2010 Commonwealth Bank Tournament of Champions in Bali. In her final tournament of the year, she defeated Anastasia Pavlyuchenkova and Kimiko Date-Krumm en route to reaching her second final in three weeks, where she defeated Alisa Kleybanova to win her second title of the year and return to the world's Top 20 for the first time in more than one year. Ivanovic ended her season by winning 21 of her last 27 matches, having lost 17 of her last 29 beforehand.

Schedule 
This is the complete schedule of events on the 2010 calendar, with player progression documented from the quarterfinals stage.

Key

January

February

March

April

May

June

July

August

September

October

November

Statistical information 
These tables present the number of singles (S), doubles (D), and mixed doubles (X) titles won by each player and each nation during the season, within all the tournament categories of the 2010 Sony Ericsson WTA Tour: the Grand Slam tournaments, the Year-end championships, the WTA Premier tournaments and the WTA International tournaments. The players/nations are sorted by:

 total number of titles (a doubles title won by two players representing the same nation counts as only one win for the nation);
 highest amount of highest category tournaments (for example, having a single Grand Slam gives preference over any kind of combination without a Grand Slam title); 
 a singles > doubles > mixed doubles hierarchy; 
 alphabetical order (by family names for players).

To avoid confusion and double counting, these tables should be updated only after an event is completed.

Titles won by player

Titles won by nation

Titles information 
The following players won their first title in singles (S), doubles (D) or mixed doubles (X):
  Sofia Arvidsson – Quebec City (D)
  Timea Bacsinszky – Budapest (D)
  Alberta Brianti – Palermo (D)
  Chang Kai-chen – Osaka (D)
  Mariana Duque Mariño – Bogotá (S)
  Edina Gallovits – Bogotá (D)
  Julia Görges – Bad Gastein (S)
  Jarmila Groth – Guangzhou (S)
  Polona Hercog – Acapulco (D)
  Kaia Kanepi – Palermo (S)
  Alisa Kleybanova – Kuala Lumpur (S)
  Maria Kondratieva – Portorož (D)
  Alla Kudryavtseva – Tashkent (S)
  Johanna Larsson – Quebec City (D)
  Ekaterina Makarova – Eastbourne (S)
  Alexandra Panova – Tashkent (D)
  Anastasia Pavlyuchenkova – Monterrey (S)
  Anastasija Sevastova – Estoril (S)

The following players completed a successful title defence in singles (S), doubles (D) or mixed doubles (X):
  Cara Black – Birmingham (D)
  Kim Clijsters – US Open (S)
  Elena Dementieva – Sydney (S)
  Alexandra Dulgheru – Warsaw (S)
  Gisela Dulko – Båstad (D)
  Lucie Hradecká – Bad Gastein (D)
  Flavia Pennetta – Båstad (D)
  Nadia Petrova – Charleston (D)
  Tatiana Poutchek – Tashkent (D)
  Ágnes Szávay – Budapest (S)
  Tamarine Tanasugarn – Pattaya (D)
  Vladimíra Uhlířová – Potorož (D)
  Serena Williams – Australian Open (S/D), Wimbledon (S)
  Venus Williams – Australian Open (D), Dubai (S), Acapulco (S)
  Caroline Wozniacki – Ponte Vedra Beach (S), New Haven (S)
  Vera Zvonareva – Pattaya (S)

Rankings

Singles 
The following is the 2010 top 20 in the Race To The Championships and the top 20 rank players in the world. Premier Mandatory Events are counted for players in the top 10, even if they did not compete, unless there is an injury excuse.

Number 1 Ranking

Doubles 
The following is the 2010 top 20 in the Race To The Championships – Doubles and the top 20 individual ranked doubles players.

Number 1 Ranking

Prize money leaders 
The top-19 players earned over $1,000,000.

As of 8 November 2010

1Only for 2008 year-end top 10, Certain players receive fines for skipping events

Statistics leaders 
As of October 25, 2010. Source

Point Distribution

Retirements 
Following is a list of notable players (winners of a main tour title, and/or part of the WTA rankings top 100 (singles) or (doubles) for at least one week) who announced their retirement from professional tennis, became inactive (after not playing for more than 52 weeks), or were permanently banned from playing, during the 2010 season:
  Elena Dementieva
  Lindsay Davenport
  Janette Husárová
  Katarina Srebotnik(still to compete in doubles)
  Alina Jidkova
  Jelena Kostanić Tošić
  Marta Marrero
  Camille Pin
  Virginia Ruano Pascual
  Mara Santangelo (still to compete in doubles)
  Nicole Vaidišová
  Rossana de los Ríos
  Iroda Tulyaganova
  Tatiana Perebiynis
  Laura Granville
  Anikó Kapros
  Sun Tiantian
  Meilen Tu
  Shenay Perry

See also 
 2010 ATP World Tour
 2010 ATP Challenger Tour
 2010 ITF Women's Circuit
 Women's Tennis Association
 International Tennis Federation

References

External links 
 Women's Tennis Association (WTA) official website
 International Tennis Federation (ITF) official website

 
WTA Tour
WTA Tour seasons